The environment of the United States comprises diverse biotas, climates, and geologies. This diversity leads to a number of different distinct regions and geographies in which human communities live. This includes a rich variety of species of both animals other fauna, and flora. 

Because of the strong forces of economic exploitation and industrialization, human's have had deep effects on the ecosystems of the United States, resulting in a number of environmental issues. 

Since awareness of these issues emerged in the 1970s, environmental regulations and a growing environmental movement, including both climate movement and the environmental justice movement have emerged to respond to the various threats to the environment. These movements are intertwined with a long history of conservation, starting in the early 19th century, that has resulted in a robust network of protected areas, including 28.8% of land managed by the Federal government.

Biota

Animals 
There are about 21,717 different species of native plants and animals in the United States.  More than 400 mammal, 700 bird, 500 reptile and amphibian, and 90,000 insect species have been documented. Wetlands, such as the Florida Everglades, are the base for much of this diversity.  There are over 140,000 invertebrates in the United States which is constantly growing as researchers identify more species.  Fish are the largest group of animal species, with over one thousand counted so far.  About 13,000 species are added to the list of known organisms each year.

Fungi 
Around 14,000 species of fungi were listed by Farr, Bills, Chamuris and Rossman in 1989. Still, this list only included terrestrial species. It did not include lichen-forming fungi, fungi on dung, freshwater fungi, marine fungi or many other categories.  Fungi are essential to the survival of many groups of organisms.

Plants 
With habitats ranging from tropical to Arctic, U.S. plant life is very diverse. The country has more than 17,000 identified native species of flora, including 5,000 in California (home to the tallest, the most massive, and the oldest trees in the world). Three quarters of the United States species consist of flowering plants.

Human impacts on biota 
The country's ecosystems include thousands of nonnative exotic species that often harm indigenous communities of living things. Many indigenous species became extinct soon after first human settlement, including the North American megafauna; others have become nearly extinct since European settlement, among them the American bison and California condor. Many plants and animals have declined dramatically as a result of massive conversion and other human activity.

Climate 

  The U.S. climate is temperate in most areas, tropical in Hawaii and southern Florida, polar in Alaska, semiarid in the Great Plains west of the 100th meridian, Mediterranean in coastal California and arid in the Great Basin.  Its comparatively generous climate contributed (in part) to the country's rise as a world power, with infrequent severe drought in the major agricultural regions, a general lack of widespread flooding, and a mainly temperate climate that receives adequate precipitation.

Following World War II, the West's cities experienced an economic and population boom. The population growth, mostly in the Southwest, has strained water and power resources, with water diverted from agricultural uses to major population centers, such as Las Vegas and Los Angeles. According to the California Department of Water Resources, if more supplies are not found by 2020, residents will face a water shortfall nearly as great as the amount consumed today.

The United States mainland contains a total of nine distinct regional climates.  Those include Northwestern region, the High plains, Midwest/Ohio valley region, New England/mid Atlantic, Southeast, Southern region, and Southwestern region.  Each region contains different states and has their own climate and temperatures throughout the year.

Geology

Environmental law and conservation 

The nation's major environmental laws were enacted between 1969 and 1980:
 National Environmental Policy Act (1969)
 Clean Air Act (1970)
 Federal Insecticide, Fungicide, and Rodenticide Act (1972)
 Clean Water Act (1972)
 Endangered Species Act (1973)
 Safe Drinking Water Act (1974)
 Resource Conservation and Recovery Act (1976)
 Toxic Substances Control Act (1976)
 "Superfund" Act (1980)

The Endangered Species Act of protects threatened and endangered species and their habitats, which are monitored by the U.S. Fish and Wildlife Service.

Protected areas

The United States maintains national parks as well as other preservation areas, such as the Florida Everglades. There are more than 400 protected sites spread across 84 million acres but very few are large enough to contain ecosystems.

In 1872, the world's first national park was established at Yellowstone. Another fifty-seven national parks and hundreds of other federally managed parks and forests have since been formed. Wilderness areas have been established around the country to ensure long-term protection of pristine habitats. Altogether, the U.S. government regulates 1,020,779 square miles (2,643,807 km2), 28.8% of the country's total land area. Protected parks and forestland constitute most of this. As of March 2004, approximately 16% of public land under Bureau of Land Management administration was being leased for commercial oil and natural gas drilling; public land is also leased for mining and cattle ranching.

Environmental issues

Climate change

Conservation

See also 

 Ecotourism in the United States
 Great Plains Population and Environment Data Series
 List of Superfund sites in the United States
 MyEnvironment (website)
 National Conservation Exposition
 National Environmental Information Exchange Network
 Timeline of major U.S. environmental and occupational health regulation

References

Further reading 
 
 Reed, Daniel. 2009. Environmental and Renewable Energy Innovation Potential Among the States: State Rankings. Applied Research Project. Texas State University.
 Tresner, Erin. 2009. Factors Affecting States' Ranking on the 2007 Forbes List of America's Greenest States. Applied Research Project, Texas State University.

External links 
 Environment at the Pew Charitable Trust